The Tassajara Fire was a wildfire that started on September 20, 2015, in the Santa Lucia Range, in Monterey County, California.

The fire swiftly burned  of land in a rural, residential area near the Los Padres Forest, including 12 homes and numerous outbuildings.

It was contained a week later on September 27.

The smoke plume was visible throughout the Monterey Bay and Salinas Valley regions.

References

Wildfires in Monterey County, California
2015 California wildfires
Santa Lucia Range
Monterey Ranger District, Los Padres National Forest